Akie is a feminine Japanese given name.

Possible writings
Akie can be written using many different combinations of kanji characters. Here are some examples: 

明江, "bright, creek"
明恵, "bright, grace"
明絵, "bright, drawing"
明枝, "bright, branch"
明慧, "bright, wise"
昭江, "clear, creek"
昭恵, "clear, grace"
昭絵, "clear, drawing"
昭枝, "clear, branch"
昭慧, "clear, wise"
秋江, "autumn, creek"
秋恵, "autumn, grace"
秋絵, "autumn, drawing"
晶江, "sparkle, creek"
晶恵, "sparkle, grace"
晶絵, "sparkle, drawing"
章慧, "chapter, wise"
章恵, "chapter, grace"
章絵, "chapter, drawing"
彰江, "clear, creek"
晃慧, "clear, wise"
朗枝, "clear, branch"
亜紀恵, "Asia, chronicle, wise"

The name can also be written in hiragana あきえ or katakana アキエ.

Notable people with the name
, Japanese socialite, radio personality and wife of Shinzō Abe, Prime Minister of Japan
, Japanese comedian
, Japanese freestyle wrestler
, is a Japanese tarento
, Japanese handball player
, Japanese idol, singer and actress

Japanese feminine given names